Duel is a 1957 Soviet drama film directed by Vladimir Petrov.

Plot 
The film takes place in 1896 in a small town. The regiment gets drunk and second lieutenant Romashov falls in love with the captain's spouse as a result of which the men quarrel.

Cast 
 Nikolai Komissarov as Lieutenant Shulgovich
 Andrei Popov as Vasily Nazansky
 Yuri Puzyryov as Georgy Romashov
 Mikhail Nazvanov as Vladimir Nikolayev
 Irina Skobtseva as Aleksandra Nikolayeva
 Lidiya Sukharevskaya as Raisa Peterson
 Sergei Blinnikov as Lekh
 Nikolay Bogolyubov as Osadchiy
 Vladimir Belokurov as Dits
 Yevgeny Yevstigneyev as Captain Peterson
 Aleksandr Gumburg as Sliva
 Noy Avaliani as Bek-Agamalov
 Pavel Pavlenko as Captain Svetlovidov
 Leonid Parkhomenko as Pavel Vetkin
 Aleksandr Lebedev as Khlebnikov
 Radner Muratov as Gaynan
 Lev Perfilov as Lobov

See also
 The Duel, 1910 film

References

External links 
 

1957 drama films
1957 films
1950s Russian-language films
Soviet black-and-white films
Soviet drama films
Adaptations of works by Aleksandr Kuprin
Films about duels
Films scored by Aram Khachaturian
Mosfilm films